Wacław Żenczykowski (26 November 1897 in Kielce – 18 February 1957 in Zürich), was a Polish structural engineer. He was a member of Polish Academy of Sciences and a professor at Warsaw University of Technology. During 1925 to 1939, he designed over 40 projects involving large buildings, including Patria Hotel in Krynica, the edifice of Dyrekcja PKP on Targowa Street in Warsaw, as well as Warsaw Główna rail station.

Notable works
 Budownictwo ogólne (General building)

References
 

Academic staff of the Warsaw University of Technology
20th-century Polish engineers
1897 births
1957 deaths